Black Point-Green Point is a census-designated place (CDP) in Marin County, California, United States. It is unincorporated, sitting between the city of Novato to the southwest and the Petaluma River and San Pablo Bay to the northeast. The population was 1,431 at the 2020 census.

History
Black Point was part of the Rancho de Novato land grant. The 1880 History of Marin County by Alley, Bowen and Co. mentions "a man by name of Day" who "settled on an island in Novato township which has since borne his name" in 1851. This island is still known as Day Island. According to the book, several more settlers moved into the area in 1853. Some of them owned land there, while others were squatters, a problem common across the county. Lumber that came from Black Point was used to build part of the USS Saginaw, a steamer built at the Mare Island Naval Shipyard. It served in the navy until 1870, when it ran aground on a reef not far from Ocean island. Deer Island, a former island east of Olive Avenue, actually was an island in the early 1900s. The house on the island, owned by Antonio DeBorba, whose shop on Grant Avenue is still intact, was completely encompassed by water, and his house was only accessible by boat. When both the county and the state refused to build a levee, he spent a small fortune deepening the creek and taking water out of the marsh. Once that was done, he donated the land that is now Highway 37.

The first Black Point post office operated from 1865 to 1891. The Grandview post office opened in 1905, changed its name to Black Point in 1944, and closed in 1952. Black Point-Green Point is located along the Brazos Railroad Subdivision, with Northwestern Pacific running trains through twice a week. Trains passing through Black Point-Green Point cross the Black Point Railroad Bridge, built in 1911. The fields to the south of Black Point were used for the location of the Black Point Communications Annex, an antenna array that was used to communicate with the Hamilton Air Force Base.

Geography
The Petaluma River, which forms the northeast edge of the community, is the Sonoma County line.

Black Point-Green Point is also located near various public lands, such as the Rush Creek Open Space Preserve and the Vince Mulroy Wildlife Prerserve.

Commercial activity
There are several businesses in Black Point-Green Point, such as Rossi's Deli (an old gas station built in the 1930s), Penske Truck Rental, Kelleher Lumber, and two self-storages. There used to be an inn built during the 1890s, but it burned down in the spring of 1976. Black Point also used to have a train station and a freight depot near the lumberyard. The Northwestern Pacific Railroad also used to operate a quarry in Black Point to produce ballast and fills for the railroad. Several of the scars still remain visible from Harbor Drive.

Demographics

2010
The 2010 United States Census reported that Black Point-Green Point had a population of 1,306. The racial makeup of Black Point-Green Point was 1,185 (90.7%) White, 7 (0.5%) African American, 6 (0.5%) Native American, 45 (3.4%) Asian, 0 (0.0%) Pacific Islander, 28 (2.1%) from other races, and 35 (2.7%) from two or more races. Hispanic or Latino of any race were 112 persons (8.6%).

The Census reported that 100% of the population lived in households.

There were 578 households, out of which 109 (18.9%) had children under the age of 18 living in them, 315 (54.5%) were opposite-sex married couples living together, 30 (5.2%) had a female householder with no husband present, 22 (3.8%) had a male householder with no wife present.  There were 45 (7.8%) unmarried opposite-sex partnerships, and 9 (1.6%) same-sex married couples or partnerships. 148 households (25.6%) were made up of individuals, and 48 (8.3%) had someone living alone who was 65 years of age or older. The average household size was 2.26.  There were 367 families (63.5% of all households); the average family size was 2.70.

The population was spread out, with 197 people (15.1%) under the age of 18, 69 people (5.3%) aged 18 to 24, 199 people (15.2%) aged 25 to 44, 550 people (42.1%) aged 45 to 64, and 291 people (22.3%) who were 65 years of age or older.  The median age was 53.2 years. For every 100 females, there were 94.6 males. For every 100 females age 18 and over, there were 93.9 males.

The homeowner vacancy rate was 0.6%; the rental vacancy rate was 4.9%. 83.5% of the population lived in owner-occupied housing units and 16.5% lived in rental housing units.

2000
As of the census of 2000, there were 1,143 people, 479 households, and 331 families residing in the CDP. The racial makeup of the CDP in 2010 was 85.5% non-Hispanic White, 0.5% non-Hispanic Black or African American, 0.3% Native American, 3.4% Asian, 0.2% from other races, and 1.6% from two or more races. 8.6% of the population were Hispanic or Latino of any race.

There were 479 households, out of which 22.3% had children under the age of 18 living with them, 60.1% were married couples living together, 7.1% had a female householder with no husband present, and 30.7% were non-families. 21.5% of all households were made up of individuals, and 5.8% had someone living alone who was 65 years of age or older.  The average household size was 2.39 and the average family size was 2.77.

In the CDP, the population was spread out, with 18.2% under the age of 18, 3.4% from 18 to 24, 22.6% from 25 to 44, 41.6% from 45 to 64, and 14.2% who were 65 years of age or older.  The median age was 47 years. For every 100 females, there were 89.6 males.  For every 100 females age 18 and over, there were 94.4 males.

The median income for a household in the CDP was $92,729, and the median income for a family was $104,531. Males had a median income of $76,782 versus $50,769 for females. The per capita income for the CDP was $52,372.  About 1.9% of families and 2.9% of the population were below the poverty line, including 6.5% of those under age 18 and none of those age 65 or over.

References

Census-designated places in Marin County, California
Census-designated places in California
Populated coastal places in California